This is a list of all personnel changes for the 2016 Indian Premier League.

Draft
Following the two-year suspension of Chennai Super Kings and Rajasthan Royals, two new franchises Rising Pune Supergiants and Gujarat Lions were established. These two franchises were allowed to draft a maximum of five players each from the Chennai and Rajasthan teams. The draft took place on 15 December 2015 and the following players were bought:

Retained players
Prior to the auction, teams could release players and retain those that they wanted for the next season. The salaries of the released players would be added to the salary purse of the teams which was increased to Rs. 66 crores for the 2016 edition. The salaries of the retained players was deducted from this purse.

Transfers
The first trading window was open between 15 and 31 December 2015, and the second trading window was open from 11 to 25 January 2016. After the players auction on 6 February 2016, a third window was open between 8 February and 19 February 2016.

The following transfers were made during the trading windows:

Auction
The players auction for the 2016 Indian Premier League was held in Bangalore on 6 February 2016. All the eight franchises had taken part in the auction.

Sold players
Out of the 351 cricketers shortlisted, 94 were sold at the auction. 66 of these players were Indian and the remaining 28 were overseas cricketers. A total of 136 crore was spent by the eight franchises at the auction.

Unsold players

Batsmen

 Martin Guptill
 Michael Hussey
 Cameron White
 Mahela Jayawardene
 David Hussey
 Usman Khawaja
 Owais Shah
 Adam Voges
 Hashim Amla
 Rilee Rossouw
 Joe Burns
 George Bailey
 Subramaniam Badrinath
 Tamim Iqbal
 Marlon Samuels
 Richard Levi
 Darren Bravo
 Nic Maddinson
 Cheteshwar Pujara
 Michael Klinger
 Aiden Blizzard
 Abhinav Mukund
 Dean Elgar
 Lahiru Thirimanne
 Reeza Hendricks
 Mithun Manhas
 Alex Ross
 Udit Birla
 Srikkanth Anirudha
 Evin Lewis
 Samarth Singh
 Prashant Chopra
 Ishank Jaggi
 Robin Bist
 Swapnil Asnodkar
 Himanshu Rana
 Tanmay Srivastava
 Asad Pathan
 Shalabh Srivastava
 Shubham Chaubey
 Shivam Chaudhary
 Chirag Gandhi
 Prashant Gupta
 Mohit Hooda
 Govinda Poddar
 Aditya Waghmode
 Mohammad Saif
 Rajesh Sharma
 Mohammad Taha
 Manpreet Juneja
 Vijay Zol
 Debabrata Das
 Saurabh Wakaskar
 Ankit Bawne
 Apoorv Wankhade
 Virat Singh
 Paul Valthaty
 Rinku Singh

Bowlers

 James Pattinson
 Nathan Lyon
 Mthokozisi Shezi
 Shaun Tait
 Pragyan Ojha
 Munaf Patel
 Shannon Gabriel
 Jackson Bird
 Nuwan Kulasekara
 Ajantha Mendis
 Sachithra Senanayake
 Fidel Edwards
 Jerome Taylor
 Cameron Boyce
 Hardus Viljoen
 Rahul Sharma
 Parvinder Awana
 Taskin Ahmed
 Dushmantha Chameera
 Krishmar Santokie
 Pankaj Singh
 Sudeep Tyagi
 Ben Laughlin
 Michael Beer
 Tino Best
 Veerasammy Permaul
 Beuran Hendricks
 Devendra Bishoo
 Sulieman Benn
 HS Sharath
 CV Stephen
 Rajwinder Singh
 Vinay Choudhary
 Aniket Choudhary
 Hardik Patel
 Saurabh Kumar
 Krishna Das
 Seth Rance
 Pulkit Narang
 Tabraiz Shamsi
 Karanveer Singh
 Jasinder Singh
 Mitrakant Yadav
 Rishi Arothe
 Nikit Dhumal
 Mohammad Javed
 Akshay Chauhan
 Tushar Deshpande
 Sayan Ghosh
 Israr Azim
 Prasidh Krishna
 Shubham Mavi
 M Mohammed
 Chandrakant Sakure
 Basant Mohanty
 Balwinder Sandhu
 Aswin Crist
 Alok Pratap Singh
 Royston Dias
 Baltej Singh
 Harmeet Singh Bansal
 Prasanth Parameswaran
 Rahul Shukla
 Bhargav Bhatt
 Ali Murtaza
 Domnic Joseph
 Basil Thampi
 Krishnakant Upadhyay
 Navdeep Saini
 Yuvraj Chudasama
 KK Jiyas
 Ronit More
 Veer Pratap Singh
 Pankaj Jaiswal
 Rahil Shah
 Rajesh Bishnoi
 Babashafi Pathan
 Siddharth Trivedi
 Avesh Khan

Wicket Keepers

 Brad Haddin
 Johnson Charles
 Mushfiqur Rahim
 Shane Dowrich
 Ben Dunk
 Morne van Wyk
 Tim Ludeman
 CM Gautam
 Nitin Saini
 Nicholas Pooran
 Cameron Bancroft
 Pinal Shah
 Sadiq Kirmani
 Pradeep Malik
 Jaskaranvir Singh Sohi
 Avi Barot
 Manvinder Bisla
 Ian Dev Singh
 Arun Karthik
 Srikar Bharat
 Shreevats Goswami
 Smit Patel
 Mahesh Rawat
 Dishant Yagnik
 Kedar Devdhar
 Vishant More

All-Rounders

 Tillakaratne Dilshan
 Chris Jordan
 Ravi Bopara
 Manoj Tiwary
 Robin Peterson
 James Neesham
 Wayne Parnell
 Henry Davids
 Johan Botha
 Vernon Philander
 Jeevan Mendis
 Dilruwan Perera
 Ashton Agar
 Darren Sammy
 Nathan McCullum
 Sean Abbott
 Shehan Jayasuriya
 Narsingh Deonarine
 Soumya Sarkar
 Dasun Shanaka
 Milinda Siriwardana
 George Worker
 Grant Elliott
 Rayad Emrit
 Antony Dhas
 Juan Theron
 Abhishek Nayar
 Isuru Udana
 Kevon Cooper
 Dilshan Munaweera
 Doug Bracewell
 Anton Devcich
 Seekkuge Prasanna
 Kevin O'Brien
 Christopher Barnwell
 Dwaine Pretorius
 Jamaluddin Syed Mohammad
 Sachin Rana
 Dinesh Salunkhe
 Gurinder Singh
 Priyank Panchal
 Baba Indrajith
 Jatin Saxena
 Sagar Trivedi
 Amit Verma
 Chirag Jani
 Akash Bhandari
 Faiz Fazal
 Nikhil Dutta
 Aniruddha Joshi
 Suboth Bhati
 Aamir Gani
 David Mathias
 Hiten Dalal
 Rohan Raje
 Dharmendrasinh Jadeja
 Ravi Jangid
 J. Kousik
 Pargat Singh
 Washington Sundar
 Rahul Dagar
 Mayank Dagar
 Sunil Raju
 Mayur Sanap
 Bandeep Singh
 Milind Tandon
 Rahul Tripathi
 Saurabh Dubey
 Venkatesh Iyer
 Rohit Sharma
 Mayank Sidhana
 Shashank Singh
 Chandra Pal Singh
 Tanveer-Ul-Haq
 Shubham Ranjane
 Ashok Menaria
 Yogesh Nagar
 Milind Kumar
 Sumit Narwal
 Biplab Samantray
 Rush Kalaria
 Jalaj Saxena
 Raiphi Gomez
 Kuldeep Hooda
 Vaibhav Rawal
 Padmanabhan Prasanth
 Jay Bista
 Kshitiz Sharma
 Shrikant Mundhe
 Abhishek Raut
 Rohan Prem
 Manjeet Kumar Chaudhary
 Rahul Tewatia
 Amit Yadav

Support staff changes
 In October 2015, Jacques Kallis was appointed head coach of the Kolkata Knight Riders. Kallis, who was the batting consultant during the 2015 season, replaced Trevor Bayliss at the position.
 In October 2015, Simon Katich was appointed assistant coach of Kolkata Knight Riders, replacing Vijay Dahiya.
 In December 2015, Anil Kumble stepped down as the mentor of Mumbai Indians.
 In December 2015, Gary Kirsten was sacked as the Delhi Daredevils head coach.
 In January 2016, Stephen Fleming was appointed as the head coach of Rising Pune Supergiants.
 In February 2016, Virender Sehwag was appointed as the mentor of Kings XI Punjab.
 In February 2016, Brad Hodge was appointed as the coach of Gujarat Lions.
 In February 2016, Rising Pune Supergiants appointed Hrishikesh Kanitkar as their assistant coach.
 In February 2016, Gujarat Lions appointed Heath Streak as their bowling coach.
 In February 2016, Rising Pune Supergiants appointed Eric Simons as their bowling coach.
 In March 2016, Paddy Upton was appointed head coach of the Delhi Daredevils, while Rahul Dravid was appointed as the team's mentor.

Withdrawn players
The following players withdrew from the tournament either due to injuries or because of other reasons.

References

External links

personnel changes
Indian Premier League personnel changes
Cricket player auction lists